Jhonattan Vegas (born 19 August 1984) is a Venezuelan professional golfer who plays on the PGA Tour and is a two-time Olympian.

Vegas was born in Maturín, Venezuela. He played college golf at the University of Texas, graduating with a degree in kinesiology. Vegas turned professional in 2008, started playing the Nationwide Tour in 2009 and moved up to the PGA Tour in 2011.

Professional career
Vegas represented Venezuela in the 2009 Omega Mission Hills World Cup with Alfredo Adrian. They finished tied for 12th place.

Vegas won his first Nationwide Tour event in 2010 at the Preferred Health Systems Wichita Open. He finished the season 7th on the money list and earned his 2011 PGA Tour card, the first Venezuelan to do so.

On 23 January 2011, Vegas won his first PGA Tour event, the Bob Hope Classic, after defeating Tour veteran Bill Haas and Gary Woodland in a sudden death playoff.
It was Vegas' fifth overall start on the PGA Tour and the second as a member of the tour. The victory is the first by a Venezuelan at a PGA Tour event; Vegas earned entry into the Masters and a two-year exemption on the PGA Tour. In his next start he finished in a tie for 3rd at the Farmers Insurance Open, holding a share of the lead on the back nine and moved to a career OWGR high of 69th. Vegas was the first PGA Tour rookie to lead the FedEx Cup standings.

In July 2012, Vegas was the runner-up finisher at the annual Telus World Skins Game to Paul Casey held in Halifax, Nova Scotia, after having won the 2011 event in Banff, Alberta.

Vegas started 2013 with three missed cuts in three tournaments. He sat out the remainder of the 2013 season after shoulder surgery. Vegas attempted to regain his PGA Tour status through the Web.com Tour Finals, but fell short and started the 2013–14 season on a Medical Extension. He satisfied his medical extension with a T3 finish at the John Deere Classic.

Vegas finished the 2014–15 season 153rd in the FedEx Cup and just outside the top 25 in the Web.com Tour Finals, limiting him to past champion status for the 2015–16 PGA Tour season. After some near-wins and collapses during the season, he earned his second career PGA Tour win at the RBC Canadian Open, regaining full Tour privileges through the 2017–18 season. He was also Venezuela's representative in golf for the 2016 Summer Olympics. On 30 July 2017 Vegas successfully defended his title at the RBC Canadian Open for his third PGA Tour win. The win also moved him to a career-high 48th in the OWGR. 

Vegas peaked at 35th in the world and in 2017, he became the first player from Venezuela to compete in the Presidents Cup. In 2021, Vegas was Venezuela's representative in golf for the 2020 Summer Olympics in Tokyo where he finished 16th.

Professional wins (6)

PGA Tour wins (3)

PGA Tour playoff record (2–0)

Nationwide Tour wins (1)

Tour de las Américas wins (1)

1Co-sanctioned by the TPG Tour

Other wins (1)

Results in major championships
Results not in chronological order in 2020.

CUT = missed the half-way cut
"T" = tied
NT = No tournament due to COVID-19 pandemic

Summary

Most consecutive cuts made – 2 (twice)
Longest streak of top-10s – 0

Results in The Players Championship

CUT = missed the halfway cut
"T" indicates a tie for a place
C = Cancelled after the first round due to the COVID-19 pandemic

Results in World Golf Championships
Results not in chronological order prior to 2015.

"T" = tied

Team appearances
Amateur
Eisenhower Trophy (representing Venezuela): 2002

Professional
World Cup (representing Venezuela): 2009, 2016, 2018
Presidents Cup (representing the International team): 2017

See also
2010 Nationwide Tour graduates
Golf in Venezuela

References

External links

Venezuelan male golfers
PGA Tour golfers
Olympic golfers of Venezuela
Golfers at the 2016 Summer Olympics
Golfers at the 2020 Summer Olympics
Texas Longhorns men's golfers
Korn Ferry Tour graduates
People from Maturín
Golfers from Houston
1984 births
Living people